Chaudfontaine is also a brand of mineral water, owned by The Coca-Cola Company.

Chaudfontaine is a municipality of Wallonia located in the province of Liège, Belgium. 

On January 1, 2006, Chaudfontaine had a total population of 21,012. The total area is 25.52 km² which gives a population density of 823 inhabitants per km².

The municipality consists of the following districts: Beaufays, Chaudfontaine, Embourg, and Vaux-sous-Chèvremont.

Some of its best-known enterprises are Galler chocolates, Magotteaux and Chaudfontaine drinking waters.

Chaudfontaine was strongly hit by the 2021 European floods.

See also
 Fort de Chaudfontaine, a fort on the heights above the town
 List of protected heritage sites in Chaudfontaine

References

External links
 

 
Municipalities of Liège Province
Spa towns in Belgium